FC Barcelona has a professional beach soccer team, which was founded in 2011, and Ramiro Amarelle, one of the best players in the world, was appointed player-coach of the team.

In 2015, FC Barcelona won the fourth edition of the Mundialito de Clubes (Club World Cup) after beating Vasco da Gama in the final.

Barcelona Beach Soccer Cup 2015 squad 

Coach:  Ramiro Amarelle

Honours

International competitions 

Mundialito de Clubes
 Quarter Final: 2012
 Quarter Final: 2011
 Winners: 2015

References 

Beach soccer clubs
FC Barcelona